2,2-Dichloropropionic acid is the organic compound with the formula CH3CCl2CO2H.  It is a colorless liquid. Its sodium salt once was marketed under the name Dalapon as a selective herbicide used to control perennial grasses.

References 

Carboxylic acids
Organochlorides